Like Wow is the debut EP of RudeGRL + CC, a collaborative project of Jenna Dickens (aka RudeGRL, from Basement Jaxx, Sub Focus) and Chris Constantinou (The Wolfmen, Sinead O’Connor, Adam Ant, The Mutants, One Thousand Motels).

Background
Jenna Dickens has a hip hop background and writes the lyrics and sings. Chris Constantinou has a punk rock background and writes and plays all the instruments and co-produces (co-production together with Nicholas de Carlo). The runner-up to Miss Burlesque 2018 Bunni Morretto is a dancer and visual element in the collaboration.

Reception
The EP was noted for confronting subjects like racial abuse, homophobia, addiction, and sexual violence, but also for having a positive message of resilience and recovery. It received a 7/10 rating from Vive Le Rock.

Track listing

References

2020 debut EPs
Punk rap albums